The 2016–17 Odense Boldklub season was the club's 128th season, and their 55th appearance in the Danish Superliga. As well as the Superliga, the side were also competing in the DBU Pokalen. After a bad start to the season, they finished strong in the regular season as 11th. With a strong relegation round, they finished second and went forward in the European play-offs against Silkeborg IF.

First team

Last updated on 31 January 2017

Transfers and loans

Transfers in

Transfers out

Friendlies

Pre-season

Winter break

Competitions

Superliga

League table

Results summary

Results by round

Matches

Relegation round

European play-offs

Quarter-finals 

Odense won 4–3 on aggregate

Semi-finals 

Randers won 3–1 on aggregate

DBU Pokalen

Squad statistics

Goalscorers
Includes all competitive matches. The list is sorted by shirt number when total goals are equal.

Disciplinary record

References 

Odense Boldklub season
Odense Boldklub seasons